Clydach is the name of an electoral ward (and a town) in the City and County of Swansea, Wales, UK.

The electoral ward of Clydach consists of some or all of the following areas: Clydach (town), Faerdre, Glais (East), Graig Felen and Penydre in the parliamentary constituency of Gower.  The ward is bounded by Mawr to the west, and Morriston and Llansamlet to the south.

Current representation

Recent history
The first election to the new unitary City and County of Swansea Council took place in 1995. The ward was won by Labour.

In 1999, the number of seats increased from one to two. Labour held won seat (although the sitting Labour member was defeated) and the other seat was won by an Independent.

External links
Clydach.Net an independent website for the Clydach Community

Swansea electoral wards